

1800–1896

1840 
"Tippecanoe and Tyler Too" – 1840 U.S. presidential slogan of William Henry Harrison. Tippecanoe was a famous 1811 battle in which Harrison defeated Tecumseh; John Tyler was Harrison's running mate.
"Independent Treasury and Liberty" – Martin Van Buren

1844
"54-40 or fight" – James K. Polk, highlighting his position on resolving the Oregon Territory boundary dispute with Russia and the United Kingdom.
"Reannexation of Texas and Reoccupation of Oregon" – James K. Polk, drawing attention to his stand on Texas annexation and the Oregon boundary question.
"Who is James K. Polk?" – Henry Clay, suggesting that Polk was unknown, and so inexperienced and unqualified.
"Hurrah! Hurrah! The Country's Risin', for Henry Clay and Frelinghuysen!" – Henry Clay and running mate Theodore Frelinghuysen.

1848
"For President of the People" – Zachary Taylor
"The Sub Treasury and the Tariff of '46" – Lewis Cass

1852
"We Polked you in '44, We shall Pierce you in '52" – 1852 U.S. presidential campaign slogan of Franklin Pierce; the '44 referred to the 1844 election of James K. Polk as president.
"The Hero of many battles." – Winfield Scott
"First in war, first in peace" – Winfield Scott

1856
"Free Soil, Free Labor, Free Speech, Free Men, Fremont" – 1856 U.S. presidential campaign slogan of John Fremont
"Fremont and freedom" – John Fremont
"We'll Buck 'em in '56" – James Buchanan, playing on "Old Buck", the nickname associated with his last name. (Also "We Po'ked 'em in '44, we Pierced 'em in '52, and we'll Buck 'em in '56". See Franklin Pierce, 1852.)

1860
"Vote yourself a farm and horses" – Abraham Lincoln, referring to Republican support for a law granting homesteads on the American frontier areas of the West.
"Honest old Abe" – Abraham Lincoln
"The Union must and shall be preserved!" – Abraham Lincoln
"Protection to American industry" – Abraham Lincoln
"True to the Union and the Constitution to the last." – Stephen A. Douglas
"The champion of popular sovereignty." – Stephen A. Douglas
"The Union now and forever" – Stephen A. Douglas
The Union and the Constitution" – John Bell (Also "John Bell and the Constitution", and "The Union, the Constitution, and the enforcement of the laws.")

1864
"Don't change horses midstream" – Abraham Lincoln
"Union, liberty, peace" – Abraham Lincoln
"For Union and Constitution" – Abraham Lincoln (Also "The Union and the Constitution")
"An honorable, permanent and happy peace." – George B. McClellan

1868
"Let Us Have Peace" – 1868 presidential campaign slogan of Ulysses S. Grant
"Vote as You Shot" – 1868 presidential campaign slogan of Ulysses S. Grant
"Peace, Union, and constitutional government." – Horatio Seymour

1872
"Grant Us Another Term" – Ulysses S. Grant
"Turn the Rascals Out" – 1872 Horace Greeley slogan against Grantism.
"Universal amnesty, impartial suffrage" – Greeley slogan showing support for reconciling with former members of the Confederacy.

1876
"Tilden and Reform" – Samuel Tilden
"Honest Sam Tilden" – Samuel Tilden
"Tilden or Blood!" – 1877 slogan of Tilden supporters during conflict that led to the Compromise of 1877
"Hayes the true and Wheeler too" – Slogan and campaign song title for Rutherford B. Hayes and William A. Wheeler, with song adapted from 1840s "Tippecanoe and Tyler too".
"The boys in blue vote for Hayes and Wheeler" – Hayes' appeal to fellow Union Army veterans.

1884
"Rum, Romanism and Rebellion" – Republican attack because of supposed Democratic support for consuming alcoholic beverages, Catholic immigrants, and the Confederacy.
"Ma, Ma, where's my Pa?" – Used by James G. Blaine supporters against Grover Cleveland. The slogan referred to the allegation that Cleveland had fathered an illegitimate child. When Cleveland was elected, his supporters added "Gone to the White House, Ha, Ha, Ha!"
"Burn this letter!" – Cleveland supporters' attack on Blaine's supposed corruption, quoting a line from Blaine correspondence that became public.
"Tell the Truth!" – Cleveland's advice to his supporters after the allegations of his illegitimate child came to light.
"Blaine, Blaine, James G. Blaine! The continental liar from the state of Maine!" – Cleveland campaign attack on Blaine's alleged corruption in office.

1888
"Rejuvenated Republicanism" – Benjamin Harrison
"Grandfather's hat fits Ben!" – Benjamin Harrison, referring to his grandfather, William Henry Harrison
"Tippecanoe and Morton too" – Slogan and campaign song title for Benjamin Harrison and Levi P. Morton, with song adapted from 1840s "Tippecanoe and Tyler too".
"Unnecessary taxation oppresses industry." – Grover Cleveland
"Reduce the tariff on necessaries of life." – Grover Cleveland

1892
"Our choice: Cleve and Steve." – Grover Cleveland and Adlai Stevenson
"Tariff Reform" – Grover Cleveland
"No Force Bill." – Grover Cleveland (To which southern Democrats appended "No Negro Domination!")
"Harrison and Protection." – Benjamin Harrison
"Protection-Reciprocity-Honest Money." – Benjamin Harrison

1896
"Patriotism, Protection, and Prosperity" – William McKinley
"No Cross of Gold, No Crown of Thorns." – William Jennings Bryan

1900–1996

1900 
"Four more years of the full dinner pail" – William McKinley
"Let Well Enough Alone" – William McKinley

1904
"To Assure Continued Prosperity" – Theodore Roosevelt
"National Unity. Prosperity. Advancement." – Theodore Roosevelt

1908
"A Square Deal For All" – William Howard Taft
"Vote for Taft now, you can vote for Bryan any time" – William Howard Taft. The slogan referred to Bryan's two previous failed presidential bids in 1896 and 1900
"Facing the Future" – William Jennings Bryan

1912
"It is nothing but fair to leave Taft in the chair" – William Howard Taft
"Win with Wilson" – Woodrow Wilson
"Vote for 8 Hour Wilson" – Woodrow Wilson
"I am for Wilson and an 8 Hour Day" – Woodrow Wilson
"The man of the eight-hour day" – Woodrow Wilson
"A Square Deal All Around" – Theodore Roosevelt

1916
"America First and America Efficient" – Charles Evans Hughes
"He has kept us out of war." – Woodrow Wilson 1916 U.S. presidential campaign slogan
"He proved the pen mightier than the sword." – Woodrow Wilson 1916 U.S. presidential campaign slogan
"War in the East, Peace in the West, Thank God for Woodrow Wilson." – Woodrow Wilson 1916 U.S. presidential campaign slogan
"War in Europe – Peace in America – God Bless Wilson" – Woodrow Wilson 1916 U.S. presidential campaign slogan

1920
"Return to normalcy" – 1920 U.S. presidential campaign theme of Warren G. Harding, referring to returning to normal times following World War I.
"America First" 1920 US presidential campaign theme of Warren G. Harding, tapping into isolationist and anti-immigrant sentiment after World War I.
"Peace. Progress. Prosperity." – James M. Cox
"From Atlanta Prison to the White House, 1920." Eugene V. Debs, in reference to his imprisonment under the Sedition Act during World War I

1924
"Keep Cool and Keep Coolidge" – The 1924 presidential campaign slogan of Calvin Coolidge.
"Honest Days With Davis" – John W. Davis (Usually used in conjunction with an illustration of Teapot Rock to highlight the Teapot Dome scandal.)

1928
"Who but Hoover?" – 1928 U.S. presidential campaign slogan of Herbert Hoover.
"A chicken in every pot and a car in every garage" – Commonly cited version of a claim asserted in a Republican Party flier on behalf of the 1928 U.S. presidential campaign of Herbert Hoover.
"Honest. Able. Fearless." – Al Smith
"All for 'Al' and 'Al' for All." – Al Smith
"Make your wet dreams come true." – Al Smith, referring to his stand in favor of repealing Prohibition.

1932
"Happy Days Are Here Again" – 1932 slogan by Democratic presidential candidate Franklin D. Roosevelt.
"We are turning the corner" – 1932 campaign slogan in the depths of the Great Depression by Republican president Herbert Hoover.

1936
"Defeat the New Deal and Its Reckless Spending" – 1936 U.S. presidential campaign slogan of Alfred M. Landon
"Let's Get Another Deck" – 1936 U.S. presidential campaign slogan of Alfred M. Landon, using a card game metaphor to answer the "new deal" cards metaphor of Franklin D. Roosevelt
"Let's Make It a Landon-Slide" – 1936 U.S. presidential campaign slogan of Alfred M. Landon
"Life, Liberty, and Landon" – 1936 U.S. presidential campaign slogan of Alfred M. Landon
"Remember Hoover!" – 1936 U.S. presidential campaign slogan of Franklin D. Roosevelt
"Forward with Roosevelt" – Franklin Roosevelt

1940
"Better A Third Termer than a Third Rater" – 1940 U.S. presidential campaign slogan of Franklin D. Roosevelt
"I Want Roosevelt Again!" – Franklin D. Roosevelt
"Willkie for the Millionaires, Roosevelt for the Millions" – Franklin D. Roosevelt
"Carry on with Roosevelt" – Franklin D. Roosevelt
"No Third Term" – 1940 U.S. presidential campaign slogan of Wendell L. Willkie
"No Fourth Term Either" – Wendell Willkie
"Roosevelt for Ex-President" – 1940 U.S. presidential campaign slogan of Wendell Willkie
"There's No Indispensable Man" – 1940 U.S. presidential campaign slogan of Wendell L. Willkie
"We Want Willkie" – 1940 U.S. presidential campaign slogan of Wendell L. Willkie
"Win with Willkie" – 1940 U.S. presidential campaign slogan of Wendell L. Willkie

1944
"Don't swap horses in midstream" – 1944 campaign slogan of Franklin Roosevelt. The slogan was also used by Abraham Lincoln in the 1864 election.
"We are going to win this war and the peace that follows" – 1944 campaign slogan in the midst of World War II by Democratic president Franklin D. Roosevelt
"Dewey or don't we" – Thomas E. Dewey
"Win the war quicker with Dewey and Bricker" - 1944 campaign slogan during World War II in support of Thomas E. Dewey and his vice presidential nominee, John W. Bricker

1948

"I'm just wild about Harry" – 1948 U.S. presidential slogan of Harry S. Truman, taken from a 1921 popular song title written by Noble Sissle and Eubie Blake
"Pour it on 'em, Harry!" – 1948 U.S. presidential campaign slogan of Harry S. Truman
"Give Em Hell, Harry!" – Harry Truman (After a man shouted it during one of his whistle stop railroad tours)
"The Buck Stops Here"—Harry Truman (Sign kept on The Resolute Desk that became a staple of Truman's presidency)
"Dew it with Dewey" – Thomas E. Dewey
"Win with Dewey" – Thomas E. Dewey
"Get in the fight for states' rights" – Strom Thurmond
"Work with Wallace" – Henry A. Wallace
"Work for Peace" – Henry A. Wallace

1952
"I like Ike" – 1952 U.S. presidential campaign slogan of Dwight D. Eisenhower
"Madly for Adlai" – 1952 U.S. presidential campaign slogan of Adlai Stevenson

1956
"I still like Ike" – 1956 U.S. presidential campaign slogan of Dwight D. Eisenhower
"Peace and Prosperity" – 1956 U.S. presidential campaign slogan of Dwight D. Eisenhower
"Adlai and Estes – The Bestest" – Adlai Stevenson and Estes Kefauver
"The Winning Team" – Adlai Stevenson and Estes Kefauver

1960
"A time for greatness 1960" – U.S. presidential campaign theme of John F. Kennedy (Kennedy also used "We Can Do Better" and "Leadership for the 60s").
"Peace, Experience, Prosperity" – Richard Nixon's slogan showing his expertise over Kennedy.
"Experience Counts" - Richard Nixon slogan boasting the experience of the Nixon Lodge ticket.
"Kennedy, Kennedy, Kennedy" – Catchy jingle extolling Kennedy's virtues.

1964
"All the way with LBJ" – 1964 U.S. presidential campaign slogan of Lyndon B. Johnson
"In Your Heart, You Know He's Right" – 1964 U.S. presidential campaign slogan of Barry Goldwater
"In Your Guts, You Know He's Nuts" – 1964 U.S. presidential campaign slogan of Lyndon B. Johnson supporters, answering Goldwater's slogan
"The Stakes Are Too High For You To Stay Home" - 1964 U.S. campaign slogan of Lyndon B. Johnson, as seen in The Daisy Ad

1968
"Some People Talk Change, Others Cause It" – Hubert Humphrey, 1968
"This time, vote like your whole world depended on it" – 1968 slogan of Richard Nixon
"To Begin Anew..." – Eugene McCarthy, 1968
"Nixon's the One" – Richard M. Nixon, 1968

1972
"Nixon Now" – Richard M. Nixon, 1972 (also, "Nixon Now, More than Ever")
"Come home, America" – George McGovern, 1972
"Acid, Amnesty, and Abortion for All" – 1972 anti-Democratic Party slogan, from a statement made to reporter Bob Novak by Missouri Senator Thomas F. Eagleton (as related in Novak's 2007 memoir, Prince of Darkness)
"Dick Nixon Before He Dicks You" – Popular anti-Nixon slogan, 1972
"They can't lick our Dick" – Popular campaign slogan for Nixon supporters
"Don't change Dicks in the midst of a screw, vote for Nixon in '72" – Popular campaign slogan for Nixon supporters
"Unbought and Unbossed" official campaign slogan for Shirley Chisholm

1976
"He's making us proud again" – Gerald Ford
"Not Just Peanuts" – Jimmy Carter
"A Leader, for a Change" (also "Leaders, for a Change") – Jimmy Carter
"Why not the Best?" – Jimmy Carter
"Peaches And Cream" Jimmy Carter (from Georgia) and running mate Walter Mondale (from Minnesota)

1980
"Are You Better Off Than You Were Four Years Ago?" – Ronald Reagan
"Let's Make America Great Again" – Ronald Reagan
"A Tested and Trustworthy Team" – Jimmy Carter and Walter Mondale

1984
"It's Morning Again in America" – Ronald Reagan
"For New Leadership" (also "America Needs New Leadership") – Walter Mondale
"Where's the beef?" – Walter Mondale. An advertising slogan used by the restaurant chain Wendy's to imply that its competitors served sandwiches with relatively small contents of beef. Used by Mondale to imply that the program policies of rival candidate Gary Hart lacked actual substance.

1988
"A Leader for America" – Robert J. Dole
"Kinder, Gentler Nation" – George H. W. Bush
"Thousand Points of Light" – George H. W. Bush
"Read My Lips, No New Taxes" – George H. W. Bush
"On Your Side" – Michael Dukakis
"Keep Hope Alive" – Jesse Jackson

1992
"For People, for a Change" – 1992 U.S. presidential campaign slogan of Bill Clinton
"It's Time to Change America" – a theme of the 1992 U.S. presidential campaign of Bill Clinton
"Putting People First" – 1992 U.S. presidential campaign slogan of Bill Clinton
"It's the economy, stupid" – originally intended for an internal audience, it became the de facto slogan for the Bill Clinton campaign
"Stand by the President" – George H. W. Bush
"A Proud Tradition" – George H. W. Bush
"Don't Change the Team in the Middle of the Stream" – George H. W. Bush and Dan Quayle
"America First" – Pat Buchanan
"Down with King George" – Pat Buchanan, in reference to Bush
"Send Bush a Message" – Pat Buchanan
"Conservative of the Heart" – Pat Buchanan
"A Voice for the Voiceless" – Pat Buchanan
"Ross for Boss" – Ross Perot
"I'm Ross, and you're the Boss!" – Ross Perot
"Leadership for a Change" – Ross Perot

1996
"Building a bridge to the twenty-first century" – Bill Clinton
"Bob Dole. A Better Man. For a Better America." or "The Better Man for a Better America" – Bob Dole
"Go Pat Go" – Pat Buchanan

2000–present

2000
"Leadership for the New Millennium" – Al Gore presidential campaign
"Prosperity and Progress" – alternative slogan of the Al Gore presidential campaign
"Compassionate Conservatism" – George W. Bush presidential campaign
"Reformer with Results" – George W. Bush presidential campaign

2004

Republican Party candidates 

"A Safer World and a More Hopeful America" – George W. Bush presidential campaign

Democratic Party candidates 

"A Stronger America" – John Kerry campaign
"Let America Be America Again" – John Kerry presidential campaign alternative slogan
"Dean for America" – Howard Dean campaign slogan

Libertarian Party candidates 

 "Lighting the fires of Liberty, one heart at a time" used by Michael Badnarik's campaign

2008

Democratic Party candidates

"Yes We Can" – Barack Obama campaign chant, 2008
"We are the ones we've been waiting for." – 2008 U.S. presidential campaign rallying cry of Barack Obama during the Democratic convention in Denver.
"Change We Can Believe In." – 2008 US presidential campaign slogan of Barack Obama
"Change We Need." and "Change." – 2008 U.S. presidential campaign slogan of Barack Obama during the general election.
"Fired up! Ready to go!" – Barack Obama campaign chant, 2008
"Hope" – 2008 U.S. presidential campaign slogan of Barack Obama during the general election.
"Ready for change, ready to lead" – Hillary Clinton campaign slogan, also "Big Challenges, Real Solutions: Time to Pick a President," "In to Win," "Working for Change, Working for You," and "The strength and experience to make change happen."

Republican Party candidates

"Country First" – 2008 U.S. presidential campaign slogan of John McCain

"Reform, prosperity and peace" – 2008 U.S. presidential motto of John McCain.

Independent candidates

"People Fighting Back", and "We'll fight back" – Ralph Nader campaign slogan

Libertarian Party candidates

 "Liberty for America" used by Bob Barr's campaign

2012

Democratic Party candidates
"Forward" – 2012 U.S. presidential slogan of Barack Obama.
"Middle Class First" - 2012 U.S. presidential slogan of Barack Obama.

Republican Party candidates
"Believe in America" – 2012 U.S. presidential slogan of Mitt Romney.
"America's Comeback Team" – 2012 U.S. presidential slogan of Mitt Romney after picking Paul Ryan as his running mate
"Obama Isn't Working" – slogan used by Mitt Romney's 2012 campaign, a takeoff of "Labour Isn't Working," a similar campaign previously used by the British Conservative Party
"Restore Our Future" – slogan used by Mitt Romney's 2012 campaign
"The Courage to Fight for America" – 2012 U.S. presidential slogan of Rick Santorum.
"Restore America Now" – 2012 U.S. presidential slogan of Ron Paul.

Libertarian Party candidates
"The People's President" – Gary Johnson campaign slogan
"Live Free" – Gary Johnson campaign slogan

Green Party candidates
"A Green New Deal for America" – Official slogan of the Jill Stein campaign

Constitution Party candidates
"Citizenship Matters" – Virgil Goode campaign slogan

2016

Republican Party candidates
"Make America Great Again!" – used by Donald Trump's campaign
"Courageous Conservatives" and "Reigniting the Promise of America" – used by Ted Cruz's campaign, also "TRUSTED," "A Time for Truth," and "Defeat the Washington Cartel"
"A New American Century" – used by Marco Rubio's campaign.
"Kasich For America" or "Kasich For US" – used by John Kasich's campaign
"Heal. Inspire. Revive." – used by Ben Carson's campaign.
"Jeb!", "Jeb can fix it," and "All in for Jeb" – used by Jeb Bush's campaign. also "Right to Rise" and "Slow and Steady Wins the Race"
"Defeat the Washington Machine. Unleash the American Dream." – used by Rand Paul's campaign
"From Hope to Higher Ground" – used by Mike Huckabee's campaign.
"New Possibilities. Real Leadership." – used by Carly Fiorina's campaign.
"Telling it like it is."– used by Chris Christie's campaign
"Tanned, Rested, Ready."– used by Bobby Jindal's campaign

Democratic Party candidates
"Hillary For America" – used by Hillary Clinton's campaign
"Forward Together" – used by Hillary Clinton's campaign, on the side of her bus.
"Fighting for us" – used by Hillary Clinton's campaign
"I'm With Her" – used by Hillary Clinton's campaign
"Stick it to the man by voting for a woman"- used by Hillary Clinton's campaign
"Stronger Together" – used by Hillary Clinton's campaign
"Love Trumps Hate" used by Hillary Clinton's campaign
"When they go low, we go high" – used by Michelle Obama and adopted by Hillary Clinton's campaign
"A Future To Believe In" – used by Bernie Sanders' campaign
"Feel the Bern" – a common but unofficial slogan used by supporters of Bernie Sanders
 "Fixing Democracy Can't-Wait" – used by Lawrence Lessig's 2016 presidential campaign

Libertarian Party candidates
"Our Best America Yet!" – used by Gary Johnson's campaign
"Live Free" – used by Gary Johnson's campaign
"#TeamGov" – used by Gary Johnson's campaign, as a reference to both Johnson and running mate Bill Weld being former Governors of New Mexico and Massachusetts respectively.
"Be Libertarian with me" – used by Gary Johnson's campaign
"You In?" – used by Gary Johnson's campaign
"Make America Sane Again" common but unofficial slogan in support of Gary Johnson's campaign
"Taking over the government to leave everyone alone" used by Austin Petersen's campaign

Green Party candidates
"It's in our hands" – used by Jill Stein's campaign.

Independents
"It's never too late to do the right thing" – used by Evan McMullin

2020

Democratic Party candidates 

 "Build Back Better"  used by Joe Biden's campaign
 "Restore The Soul of The Nation"  used by Joe Biden's campaign
 "Our best days still lie ahead" used by Joe Biden's campaign
 "No Malarkey!" used by Joe Biden's campaign
 "Bye Don"  a common play on words by Joe Biden's campaign
 "Not me. Us." used by Bernie Sanders' campaign
 "Feel the Bern." used by Bernie Sanders' campaign
 "Dream Big Fight Hard" used by Elizabeth Warren's campaign
 "I like Mike" used by Michael Bloomberg's campaign
 "Mike will get it done" used by Michael Bloomberg's campaign
 "Win the Era" used by Pete Buttigieg's campaign
 "A new generation of leadership" used by Pete Buttigieg's campaign
 "BOOT EDGE EDGE" used by Pete Buttigieg's campaign
 "Lead with Love" used by Tulsi Gabbard's campaign
 "Humanity First" used by Andrew Yang's campaign
 "Not left. Not right. Forward." used by Andrew Yang's campaign
 "MATH - Make America Think Harder" used by Andrew Yang's campaign
 "Building Opportunity Together" used by Michael Bennet's campaign
 "Focus on the Future" used by John Delaney's campaign
 "We Rise" used by Cory Booker's campaign
 "Join the Evolution!" used by Marianne Williamson's campaign
 "One Nation. One Destiny." used by Julian Castro's campaign
 "For The People" used by Kamala Harris's campaign
 "We're all in this together." used by Beto O'Rourke's campaign
 "Our Future Is Now" used by Tim Ryan's campaign
 "Working People First" used by Bill de Blasio's campaign
 "Brave Wins" used by Kirsten Gillibrand's campaign
 "Our Moment" used by Jay Inslee's campaign
 "Stand Tall" used by John Hickenlooper's campaign
 "End the American Empire" used by Mike Gravel's campaign
 "Go Big. Be Bold. Do Good." used by Eric Swalwell's campaign
 "Take. Our. Democracy. Back." used by Ben Gleib's 2020 presidential campaign
 "Let's Save America, Ok?" used by Ben Gleib's 2020 presidential campaign

Republican Party candidates 
 "Keep America Great" used by Donald Trump's campaign
 "Make America Great Again Again" used by Trump's campaign
 "Promises Made, Promises Kept" used by Trump's campaign
 "Buy American, Hire American" used by Trump's campaign
 "Make Our Farmers Great Again" used by Trump's campaign
 "Build the Wall and Crime Will Fall" used by Trump's campaign
 "Jobs, Not Mobs" used by Trump's campaign
 "Leadership America Deserves"  used by Bill Weld's campaign

Libertarian Party candidates 

 "Real change for real people" used by Jo Jorgensen's campaign.
 "She's With Us" used by Jo Jorgensen's campaign.
 "Don't Vote McAfee" used by John McAfee's campaign
 "Advance Liberty" used by Arvin Vohra's campaign
 "Lincoln for Liberty"  used by Lincoln Chafee's campaign.

Green Party candidates 

 "For Our Future" used by Howie Hawkins' campaign
 "For an Ecosocialist Green New Deal" used by Howie Hawkins' campaign

Constitution Party candidates 

 "We need a third way" used by Don Blankenship's campaign

See also
List of United States political catchphrases
List of presidents of the United States
Slogans

References

 
 
Lists of phrases
Lists of slogans